The Heinkel He 116 was an extremely long-range mail plane designed to deliver airmail between Germany and Japan. Several examples were built for this role, as well as a small batch to be used in the long-range reconnaissance role.

Development and design
The design started in response to a 1936 request by Lufthansa, which planned a route over the Pamir Mountains in Afghanistan. At the time there were simply no engines available with that sort of altitude performance, although Hirth was working on one in the  class. The Günter brothers proposed to adapt their basic He 70 Blitz airframe to carry four of these engines to provide enough power for the massive fuel load.

The He 116 would use a modified version of the He 70's two-spar elliptical planform, skinned (like the He 70) with plywood. The fuselage was all-new, consisting of a semi-monocoque duralumin body with watertight bulkheads in case the aircraft were forced down over water. The design shared enough construction with the He 70 that the first prototype He 116 V1 was completed in early 1937.

Registrations names and designations
V1 Lübeckapparently remained unregistered.
V2 Schlesien D-JAIE  operated by Lufthansa.
V3 Rostock D-ARFD (He-116A-03 / He 116R) the third prototype modified for record breaking long-distance flights.
V4 Hamburg D-ATIO (He 116A-02)  operated by Lufthansa.
V5 Nogi J-BAKD Delivered on 29 April 1938  to Japan in a six-day flight covering  in 54 hours 17 minutes of flight time. For use by Manchurian Air Transport on the Tokyo-Hsinking route.
V6 Tojo J-EAKF Delivered on 29 April 1938  to Japan in a six-day flight covering  in 54 hours 17 minutes of flight time. For use by Manchurian Air Transport on the Tokyo-Hsinking route.
V7 & V8 converted to He 116B standard as long-range reconnaissance aircraft.
V9 to V14 (He 116B-0) Six un-armed long-range reconnaissance aircraft, relegated to photo-mapping duties.

Variants
He 116AHigh-speed long-range Mail-plane / courier aircraft, with conventional stepped windscreen: eight aircraft built (V1 to V8)

He 116B V7   and V8 were modified for the long-range reconnaissance role with a fully glazed un-stepped nose similar to the Heinkel He 111, tested during 1938 with generally favourable results. Six additional aircraft based on the V7 pattern were then ordered, designated He 116B-0, although they also received prototype numbers V9 to V14. The B-0 s were intended to operate at extremely long range, outside the range of enemy fighters, and therefore had no defensive armament fitted. All eight (V7 through V14) were issued to reconnaissance units prior to the war, but by that time the idea of a slow-moving unarmed plane providing any useful information seemed unlikely. Instead they were used over German territory providing mapping services.

He 116RV3 was removed from the line to be converted into a record-breaking prototype. The modifications included a larger  wing with a  span, and increased fuel tankage in the fuselage. The  Hirth HM 508H engines provided a better fuel economy through operation at lower rpm. For take-offs with maximum fuel the He 116R, Rostock, was fitted with four RATO units. On its first record flight attempt one of the rockets tore loose and hit the wing, requiring extensive repairs.

Operators

Luftwaffe
Lufthansa

Manchuria Aviation Company

Specifications (He 116A)

See also

References

Bibliography

1930s German mailplanes
He 116
Four-engined tractor aircraft
Four-engined piston aircraft
Aircraft first flown in 1936